Chau Siu-chung is a Hong Kong labour union worker and politician, currently a member of Legislative Council for the Labour constituency.

He is also the secretary-general for the pro-Beijing labour union Federation of Hong Kong and Kowloon Labour Unions, and a member of the Election Committee responsible for electing the Chief Executive.

Electoral performances

References 

Living people
HK LegCo Members 2022–2025
Members of the Election Committee of Hong Kong, 2021–2026
Year of birth missing (living people)